Luxe Listings Sydney is an Australian reality television series which began July 9, 2021, and airs on Amazon Prime Video. The series’ third season chronicles four real estate and buyers agents in Sydney, Australia— Simon Cohen, D'Leanne Lewis, Gavin Rubinstein and Monika Tu —as they navigate their hectic personal and business lives; whilst showcasing, buying and selling multi-million dollar properties in one of the world's most competitive real estate markets.

As of October 21, 2022, a total of 18 original episodes of Luxe Listings Sydney have aired.

Series overview

Episodes

Season 1 (2021)
Simon Cohen, D'Leanne Lewis and Gavin Rubinstein are introduced as series regulars. Shani Asadon, Patrick Cosgrove, Daniella Jooste, Oliver Lavers, Remi Lindsay, Jarryd Rubinstein, Tammy Soglanich, Cae Thomas and Evan Williams served in recurring capacities.

Season 2 (2022)
Monika Tu joined the cast. Asadon, Cosgrove, Lavers, Lindsay, Soglanich, Thomas, Williams, Jacob Hannon and Sebastian Maxwell served in recurring capacities.

Season 3 (2022)
Asadon, Cosgrove, Lavers, Lindsay, Soglanich, Thomas, Hannon, Maxwell, Tas Costi, Noa Oziel and Ching Ching Yiu served in recurring capacities.

References

External links

Sydney-related lists